Thomas Burgh, 3rd Baron Burgh KG (pronounced: Borough; c. 1558–14 October 1597) 3rd Baron Borough of Gainsborough, de jure 7th Baron Strabolgi and 9th Baron Cobham of Sterborough was the son of William Burgh, 2nd Baron Burgh and Lady Katherine Clinton, daughter of Edward Clinton, 1st Earl of Lincoln and Elizabeth Blount, former mistress of King Henry VIII. He was one of the peers who conducted the trial of the Duke of Norfolk in 1572. (aged 14?)

Sir Thomas Burgh succeeded to the title of 3rd Lord Burgh [E., 1529] on 10 September 1584, by writ. He was invested as a Knight of the Garter on 23 April 1593.

In February 1593, he was appointed as English Ambassador to Scotland. Burgh was met by Lord Seton and banqueted at Seton Palace. James VI of Scotland was in the north and Burgh had to wait in Edinburgh until 14 March when he saw the king and discussed the risks of a Spanish invasion. On 18 March he had an audience with Anne of Denmark and received "ill grace both of words and looks". Burgh and the resident diplomat Robert Bowes borrowed £300 sterling from three Edinburgh merchants, Robert Jousie, Thomas Foulis, and John Porterfield in order to reward potential supporters of English policy.

On 18 April 1597, he was appointed Lord Deputy of Ireland but held the office only briefly, dying the same year.

Burgh married Frances Vaughan, the only daughter of John Vaughan of Sutton-on-Derwent, Yorkshire, by Anne Pickering, daughter and heir of Sir Christopher Pickering, by whom he had a son and four daughters:

Robert Burgh, 4th Baron Burgh (c.1594 – 26 February 1602), buried at Winchester Cathedral 19 March 1602.
Elizabeth Burgh, married George Brooke, a younger son of William Brooke, 10th Baron Cobham, and had issue. She married secondly John Byrd of Broxton and had issue. She married thirdly Francis Reade, 2nd son of Sir William Reade, of Osterley, Middlesex. There were no issue of her third marriage.
 Anne Burgh (died after 1 June 1641), who married Sir Drew Drury on 11 October 1604.
Frances Burgh (died before 24 Nov 1618), who married Francis Coppinger.
 Katherine Burgh (died April 1646), who married, on 28 February 1620, Thomas Knyvett, son of Sir Thomas Knyvett and Elizabeth Bacon and had issue.

Burgh died at Newry, County Down, Ireland, on 14 October 1597.

In November 1613 his widow Frances, Lady Burgh, was given an allowance of £500 and went to join the household of Elizabeth Stuart, Queen of Bohemia at Heidelberg.

On the death of Burgh's son, Robert, his baronies of Burgh, Strabolgi, and Cobham of Sterborough fell into abeyance between his sisters. 314 years later, on 5 May 1916, the abeyance was terminated in favour of Alexander Henry Leith, 5th Baron Burgh (1866–1926).

Ancestry

Notes

References

See also
 Hubert de Burgh, 1st Earl of Kent (c.1170–1243) English nobleman and ancestor of the Burghs of Gainsborough

1550s births
1597 deaths
16th-century English nobility
Barons Burgh
Thomas
Year of birth uncertain
Lords Lieutenant of Ireland
Ambassadors of England to Scotland